Aldea Apeleg  is a village and rural municipality that is located in the southwest of the Chubut Province in southern Argentina. According to the Argentine National Institute of Statistics and Census (INDEC), as of 2010 Aldea Apeleg had 126 inhabitants, a 2.3% increase since the 2001 census where 119 inhabitants were recorded.

References

Populated places in Chubut Province